The IWA Mid-South Junior Heavyweight Championship is a championship created and promoted by the American promotion IWA Mid-South. The title was created in June 2018 with the inaugural champion being Logan James who defeated Jake Lander in a tournament final. There have been a total of 27 reigns and two vacancies shared between 11 different champions. The current champion is Jake Crist who is in his third reign.

Title history

Combined reigns 

{| class="wikitable sortable" style="text-align: center"
!Rank
!Wrestler
!No. ofreigns
!Combineddays
|-
!1
| Brayden Lee || 2 || 245
|-
!2
| Aaron Williams || 4 ||style="background-color:#bbeeff| ¤237-256
|-
!3
|style="background-color:#FFE6BD"| Jake Crist † || 3 || +
|-
!4
| Logan James || 5 ||style="background-color:#bbeeff| ¤187-215
|-
!5
| Kevin Giza || 4 || 130
|-
!6
| Blake 182 || 1 || 61
|-
!7
| Pat/Project Monix || 3 ||style="background-color:#bbeeff| ¤48-88
|-
!8
| Matt Diesel || 1 || 42
|-
!rowspan=2|9
|Lukas Jacobs || 2 || 21
|-
| Sage Phillips || 1 || 21
|-
!11
| Adam Slade || 1 || 1
|-

See also
Independent Wrestling Association Mid-South
History of professional wrestling in the United States

References

External links
IWA Mid-South Title Histories
 IWA Mid-South Junior Heavyweight Title History at Cagematch.net

IWA Mid-South championships
Junior heavyweight wrestling championships